The Ministry of Agriculture (MoA) is the Ethiopian government ministry which oversees the agricultural and rural development policies of Ethiopia on a federal level.

History and overview
The powers and duties of the MoA include: conservation and use of forest and wildlife resources, food security, water use and small-scale irrigation, monitoring events affecting agricultural development and early warning system, promoting agricultural development, and establishing and providing agriculture and rural technology training.

The Ministry of Agriculture was established 23 August 1995 with the passing of Proclamation 4-1995 which also established the other 14 original Ministries of the Federal Democratic Republic of Ethiopia. On 13 January 2004 Proclamation No. 300/2004, merged this Ministry with the Ministry of Rural Development. The current Minister is Oumer Hussien.

See also 
 Agriculture in Ethiopia
 Resettlement and villagization in Ethiopia

Notes

External links
 Ministry of Agriculture website
 Ethiopian Agriculture Portal, Ministry of Agriculture

Ethiopia
Agriculture
Ethiopia
Forestry in Ethiopia
Ministries established in 1995
1995 establishments in Ethiopia
Agricultural organisations based in Ethiopia